Sufi Mohammed Mizanur Rahman is a Bangladeshi industrialist and social worker. He is the founder chairman of the Bangladeshi conglomerate PHP Group of Industries. In recognition of his contribution in social welfare, the government of Bangladesh awarded him the country's second highest civilian award Ekushey Padak in 2020.

References 

Living people
Bangladeshi businesspeople
Recipients of the Ekushey Padak
Date of birth missing (living people)
Year of birth missing (living people)